African teak is a common name for several plants and may refer to:

Baikiaea plurijuga, native to the northern Kalahari
Milicia excelsa, also known as iroko, native to Africa from the Ivory Coast to Ethiopia and south to Angola and Mozambique
Pericopsis elata, also known as afrormosia, native to western Africa from the Ivory Coast to the Democratic Republic of the Congo (DRC)
Pterocarpus angolensis, native to southern Africa from Tanzania and the DRC south to South Africa

Gallery